The Lost Tapes is a two-disc compilation album by the San Francisco psychedelic rock band Big Brother and the Holding Company with Janis Joplin as lead singer. The material features 12 previously unreleased Big Brother tracks from 1966 when Joplin first joined the band through to her departure.

The second disc was originally released as a live album in 1966 entitled Live in San Francisco.

Track listing
Disc One
"Bye, Bye Baby" - 4:10
"Great White Guru" - 5:46
"Women Is Losers" - 5:09
"Oh My Soul" - 2:34
"Amazing Grace" - 11:30
"Caterpillar" - 4:11
"It's a Deal" - 2:13
"Hi Heel Sneakers" - 3:36
"Faster Pussycat Kill Kill" - 2:22
"Turtle Blues" - 6:46
"All Is Loneliness" - 9:04
"Light Is Faster Than Sound" - 6:26

Disc Two
"(Come On Baby) Let the Good Times Roll" - 2:37
"I Know You Rider" - 3:13
"Moanin' at Midnight" - 4:57
"Hey Baby" - 2:50
"Down on Me" - 2:45
"Whisperman" - 1:46
"Women Is Losers" - 3:48
"Blow My Mind" - 2:34
"Oh My Soul" - 2:34
"Ball and Chain" - 6:43
"Coo-Coo" - 2:30
"Gutra's Garden" - 4:36
"Harry" - 0:37
"Hall of the Mountain King" - 6:51

Personnel
Big Brother and the Holding Company
Janis Joplin - vocals, maracas 
James Gurley - guitar
Sam Andrew - guitar
Peter Albin - bass, vocals
David Getz - drums

References

2008 compilation albums
Big Brother and the Holding Company albums
Compilation albums published posthumously